Hess is a lunar impact crater that lies in the southern hemisphere on the far side of the Moon. The crater rim has been worn by subsequent impacts, leaving a low, eroded outer wall. The flat interior has been resurfaced by lava flows and is free of significant impacts. This floor has a slightly darker albedo than the surrounding terrain.

The crater Boyle is nearly attached to the northeastern rim of Hess, and Abbe lies to the south. To the west is the large walled plain Poincaré, and Hess is located at the eastern edge of the crater's deeply eroded outer rim. The satellite crater Hess Z is partly overlaid by the northern rim of Hess. The small crater Hess M joins the south-southwest rim of Hess to the northwest rim of Abbe.

Satellite craters 

By convention these features are identified on lunar maps by placing the letter on the side of the crater midpoint that is closest to Hess.

References 

 
 
 
 
 
 
 
 
 
 
 
 

Impact craters on the Moon